Christian Liam O'Connell (born 7 April 1973 in Winchester, Hampshire) is a British-born Australian radio disc jockey, television host, writer, and comedian. He presents The Christian O'Connell Show on weekday mornings on Gold 104.3 in Melbourne, replayed on weekday evenings on Gold 104.3 in Melbourne, 101.7 WSFM in Sydney, 97.3 FM in Brisbane, Mix 102.3 in Adelaide, and 96FM in Perth. He started The Christian O'Connell Breakfast Show in 1998, on weekday mornings at a local station in Bournemouth, England; he moved to local stations in larger cities (Liverpool in 2000, London in 2001) until it became a national show on Virgin Radio in March 2006, which became Absolute Radio in September 2008. In May 2018, O'Connell and the show moved to Australia.

O'Connell won a record-breaking number of radio awards, including 11 Sony Radio Academy Gold awards, the Radio Academy Gold Award in May 2018, and runner-up in the Crabbie's Ginger Wine Grand National in 2014. In 2014 he was the youngest radio presenter inducted into the UK Radio Academy Hall of Fame. He has performed three sold-out tours of the International Edinburgh Fringe Comedy Festival in 2013, 2014, and 2015. O'Connell has collaborated with European, Australian, and US radio shows as a guest speaker. He hosted the MacMillan Cancer comedy show at the London Palladium in 2016 and the Stand Up to Cancer show at the London Palladium in November 2017. He hosted the Q Awards between 2013 and 2017.

In February 2018, O'Connell announced he would leave Absolute Radio and emigrate to Australia to host the Gold 104.3 breakfast programme in Melbourne. He did his last broadcast of the UK's The Christian O'Connell Breakfast Show on 18 May 2018, before starting the new breakfast show on Gold 104.3 on 4 June 2018, featuring his long-running quiz 'Yay or Neigh.'

In April 2020, ARN announced that The Christian O'Connell Show would be syndicated across the country from Monday 27 April, airing for one hour from 7 PM until 8 PM on weeknights on Gold 104.3 in Melbourne, WSFM in Sydney, 97.3 FM in Brisbane, Mix 102.3 in Adelaide and 96FM in Perth.

Personal life
O'Connell was born in Winchester, England, where he was raised on a council estate. His father, of Irish origin, was a foreman for Ford at Southampton, and his mother was an NHS nurse. His maternal grandmother was Indian, having met her husband, who fought with the Gurkhas in Burma, India. O'Connell and his wife have two daughters.

O'Connell attended the Henry Beaufort School and Peter Symonds College before studying at Nottingham Trent University. He supports Premier League football team Southampton F.C. and Australian Football League team Melbourne Demons.

Career 
O'Connell's first job was as a dustman in Winchester at the age of 16 to earn some cash in the Christmas holidays. Christian started on 2CR Radio in Bournemouth in 1998. He later moved to Juice FM in Liverpool in 2000. He commented, "It was a budget, tin-pot station. They didn't have a lot of money." He formerly hosted BBC Radio 5 Live's weekend sports game show Fighting Talk from 2004-2006 and the 2013–14 season, the other presenters being BBC Football Commentator Jonathan Pearce and This Morning presenter Matt Johnson.

O'Connell hosted the Breakfast Show on indie music station XFM London from January 2001 to October 2005, where he was particularly fond of playing The Sugarcubes. While at XFM, O'Connell ran a song writing competition amongst listeners to pen an England team anthem for UEFA Euro 2004. The result was Born In England which was recorded with the assistance of acts including Supergrass, The Libertines and Delays, as well as Bernard Butler and Northern Irish actor James Nesbitt. Released under the band name "Twisted X", the song reached Number 9 on the UK Singles Chart.

O'Connell joined the Virgin Radio team making his first broadcast on 23 January 2006. He celebrated his 10th year at Virgin (changed in September 2008 to Absolute) by giving his listeners free tins of food.

Shows 
 The Christian O'Connell Breakfast Show, 2CR FM, Bournemouth (1998 – January 2000)
 The Christian O'Connell Breakfast Show, Juice FM, Liverpool (January 2000 – January 2001)
 The Christian O'Connell Breakfast Show, XFM London, (January 2001 – October 2005)
 The Christian O'Connell Breakfast Show, Virgin Radio, United Kingdom (January 2006 – September 2008)
 The Christian O'Connell Breakfast Show, Absolute Radio, United Kingdom (September 2008 - May 2018)
 The Christian O'Connell Breakfast Show, Gold 104.3, Melbourne, Australia (June 2018 – Present)
 The Christian O'Connell Show, Gold 104.3 Melbourne, 101.7 WSFM Sydney, 97.3 FM Brisbane, Mix 102.3 Adelaide, 96FM Perth (April 2020 – Present)

Notable radio guests

Steven Seagal

O'Connell has long been a fan of Hollywood action man Steven Seagal, who he had mentioned several times on radio, and remarked that he would love to meet. In 2006, after The Christian O'Connell Breakfast Show had switched to a national broadcast, he was able to interview Seagal; The Observer described the interview as "a spectacularly terrible interview in which O'Connell's questions dropped into a seemingly bottomless well of apathy." O'Connell described the interview remarking; "It was the single worst thing I've ever done on radio. And the other week I was having a go at Michael Parkinson, saying he used to be fantastic but sadly now he's become too fawning, and then I did the Seagal thing and I thought: I should just leave."

David Tennant

In November 2009, Tennant co-hosted the Absolute Breakfast Show with O'Connell for three consecutive days. In October 2010, Tennant co-hosted with O'Connell and acted out Copacabana with some of the Breakfast Show team to discover "just who shot who", something that had been debated for a few days prior to this. In September 2011, Tennant again co-hosted with O'Connell and experienced a fish-facing with a trout, as well as a tennis ball challenge outside the Absolute Radio studios.

James Nesbitt

James Nesbitt, another friend of O'Connell's, has also appeared on the show several times. He also appeared before he moved to Virgin Radio, with a guest appearance on O'Connell's XFM show in 2004.

David Cameron

David Cameron appeared on O'Connell's Absolute Radio show twice in 2009. His second appearance caused controversy when the Conservative leader used the expletives "pissed off" (referring to the public reaction to the expenses scandal) and (In reference to Twitter) said "too many twits might make a twat" while on air.

Hamish and Andy

Australian comedy duo Hamish and Andy co-hosted a world first simulcast with O'Connell on Friday 18 May 2012. The show was broadcast to coincide with both O'Connell's breakfast show and drive time on the Hamish and Andy Show on Australia's Today Network. In 2016 O'Connell and the show joined up again for a 2-day competition with a race by each of their chosen listener's to win a holiday in the UK or Australia. O'Connell's listener lost and had to endure a return flight to the UK with no holiday. He appeared again on their show in August 2017 promoting his book Radio Boy.

BBC Radio 5 Live
On 7 August 2004, O'Connell became the second person to host the BBC Radio 5 Live show Fighting Talk, following the departure of Johnny Vaughan. It was his first outing on national radio (his XFM show was broadcast only in London) and he completed 16 months presenting the show before leaving to focus on his new breakfast show at Virgin Radio. The show won a Gold Award at the 24th Sony Radio Academy Awards, with O'Connell accredited as the presenter. O'Connell returned to the FT presenter's chair on 12 January 2013, filling in for his successor (and current host) Colin Murray.

O'Connell returned to Radio 5 Live on Sunday mornings from September 2009, presenting The Christian O'Connell Solution, alongside comedian Bob Mills, as well as two guests. The hour-long show sees the panel provide comedic solutions to various stories appearing in the week's news. From 10 January 2010 it was replaced by 7 Day Sunday.

From January 2011, he presented the Saturday morning 9:00–11:00 on Radio 5 Live, standing in for Danny Baker.

Author

In September 2008, O'Connell published The Men Commandments which included a foreword by Nesbitt. In 2017 he published the children's book, Radio Boy which was quickly followed by the equally successful Hoover Boy. Both books were published through Harper Collins.

Television career
O'Connell has appeared as a guest on a BBC2 sports show with Dickie Davies as one of the fellow guests. In 2003, Christian replaced Chris Moyles on Channel 5's Live With... show and went on to present trivia show "Pub Ammo" in 2004 on the same channel. In 2005 he also appeared on BBC2's Eggheads quiz show with Chris Smith, Roque Segade-Vieito and an Xfm listener as the other panelists on his (losing) team. He has also narrated Channel 4's Rock School.

In May 2006, O'Connell fronted Sunday Service; a Chris Evans style Sunday evening show on Sky One. In June 2006, O'Connell started his own world cup show, World Cuppa on ITV4.

In November 2006, he appeared on the BBC TV gameshow The Weakest Link. The show, recorded in early November, was shown at Christmas 2006. O'Connell admitted on his breakfast show that he went out in the 3rd round after being voted off by his fellow contestants. He blames this on his ridiculous answer to the question "Which has more legs than the other? A dog or a duck?" O'Connell answered "Neither, it's a trick question, they have the same". O'Connell appeared as a guest in a September 2008 episode of Loose Women and Ready Steady Cook to promote his book, and was reminded of his previous Weakest Link ordeal by Zoe Tyler. He later appeared a second time on a Radio DJ special in mid-2009, but fared much better, being voted off in Round 7. In February 2010, O'Connell appeared as a presenter, commentator and interviewer for the British Association of Mixed Martial Arts (BAMMA), in a similar role to the UFC's Joe Rogan. He then went on to host BT Sports Beyond the Octagon.

He has appeared on Never Mind the Buzzcoks, 5th Gear, MTV Countdown, Pointless, Win Lose or Draw. and Channel 4 Racing.

O'Connell was the inspiration behind the character Jed Maxwell, the crazed fan in an episode of I'm Alan Partridge.

On 18 January 2015, O'Connell hosted An Evening with Top Gear live on the official Top Gear YouTube channel where he interviewed James May, Richard Hammond and Jeremy Clarkson about their then-upcoming 22nd series of the show.

On 17 October 2017, O'Connell took part on The Chase, but failed to make it past the first round before being eliminated from the game.

In May 2019, he made a brief cameo in the long running Australian sitcom Neighbours.

Awards and accolades
The UK's  11 Gold Sony Radio Academy Awards.
 2003 Sony Radio Academy Gold Award for Best UK Breakfast Show of The Year
 2004 Sony Radio Academy Gold Award for UK DJ of The Year
 2005 Sony Radio Academy Gold Award for Entertainment Award
 2005 Sony Radio Academy Gold Award for National Breakfast Show of the Year
 2005 Sony Radio Academy Gold Award For Best Competition
 2006 Sony Radio Academy Gold Award for Sports Programme (Fighting Talk)
 2007 Sony Radio Academy Gold Award for a Competition (Who's Calling Christian?)
 2010 Sony Radio Academy Gold Award for Best Competition (Who's Calling Christian)
 2011 The Arqiva/Triple A Media Commercial Radio National Breakfast Show of the Year
 2013 Sony Radio Academy Gold Award Music Radio Personality of The Year
 2013 Sony Radio Academy Gold Award Best Use of Branded Content
 2013 Commercial Radio Roll of Honour Award 2013 Celebrating 40 years of commercial radio. Award for one of the industry's most significant talents
 2014 Sony Radio Academy Award Gold Best Use of Branded Content
 2014 Youngest Ever DJ Inducted into the UK Radio Academy Hall of Fame 
 2014 Arqiva Commercial Radio Awards National Presenter of The Year
 2014 Arqiva Commercial Radio Awards Gold Winner Best UK National Breakfast show of The Year
 2014 Arqiva Commercial Radio Awards Gold Winner Best Feature Award the 40 List
 2014 Arqiva Commercial Radio Awards Gold Special Achievement Award
 2016 Arqiva Commercial Radio Awards Gold Winner Best UK National Breakfast Show
 2018 TRIC Winner Best Radio Programme UK
 2018 Radio Academy Gold Award

References

External links

 
 
 Official The Christian O'Connell Show page on Gold 104.3
 Christian O'Connell interviewed From London's Evening Standard (May 2003)
 Press Gazette interview (January 2006)
 Interview with 'The Independent' (May 2006)

1973 births
Living people
British radio personalities
British radio DJs
British people of Irish descent
Absolute Radio
English emigrants to Australia
Mass media people from Winchester
Alumni of Nottingham Trent University